Jussi Uusipaavalniemi (born 19 June 1965 in Hyvinkää, Finland) is a Finnish male curler.

He started curling in 1979 at the age of 14.

He is the brother of Finnish male curler Markku Uusipaavalniemi.

Awards
Collie Campbell Memorial Award: 1992, 1997.

Teams

Men's

Mixed

Mixed doubles

References

External links

 Video: 

Living people
1965 births
People from Hyvinkää
Finnish male curlers
Finnish curling champions
Sportspeople from Uusimaa